(born Go Il-myeong (Hangul: 고일명, Hanja: 高日明), January 24, 1959) is a  Japanese mixed martial arts promoter, writer and retired professional wrestler and mixed martial artist of Korean descent. Maeda was also known by the ring name Kwik-kik-Lee during his time on the British wrestling show World of Sport (WoS). Maeda helped develop the shoot-style of professional wrestling during the late 1980s. He founded Fighting Network RINGS in 1991 which would become one of the top MMA promotions before it folded in 2002.

Professional wrestling career

New Japan Pro Wrestling (1978–1984)
Maeda entered the New Japan Pro-Wrestling (NJPW) dojo in 1978, after being discovered at a karate tournament, and debuted the same year. Like many other New Japan stars before and after him, Maeda embarked on a foreign tour to the United Kingdom, where he adopted the Kwik-kik-Lee moniker. In 1983, he participated in the first International Wrestling Grand Prix tournament, won by Hulk Hogan. He was one of three Japanese entrants to the international tournament, alongside Antonio Inoki and Rusher Kimura.

World Wrestling Federation (1984)
Maeda would briefly join Vince McMahon's WWF for a few months in the Spring of 1984 working in the opening matches of shows and even appearing a few times in televised bouts.

Universal Wrestling Federation (1984–1985)
In 1984, Maeda, Yoshiaki Fujiwara, and other New Japan defectors formed the Japanese UWF. It was during his time in the first incarnation of the UWF that his willingness to show his displeasure in the ring became known; he quarreled with Satoru Sayama (the original Tiger Mask) over the direction of the UWF, as Maeda and other wrestlers were reportedly resentful of Sayama's cramming too much creative power. This included booking himself to win all his matches, where others, Maeda included, "jobbed" in the worked matches. The promotion folded a year later, and Maeda returned to New Japan, where he became one of the promotion's biggest stars.

New Japan Pro Wrestling (1985–1988)
Maeda became involved in a real-life feud with New Japan booker and top star, Antonio Inoki, refusing to work with him in what could have been a huge moneymaking program.

In April 1986, he was involved in one of the most surreal moments in wrestling history during a match with André the Giant; neither man could agree to losing the match. Andre appeared drunk and started no selling Maeda's moves. Then Maeda proceeded to shoot kick André's legs and repeatedly take him down. After 30 minutes of this, André voluntarily laid down to be pinned (in spite of being assured that Maeda would lose the match), but Akira refused to do so. Inoki eventually came to the ring and demanded the match to end, much to the bewilderment of the audience.

On November 19, 1987, during a six-man tag team match, as Riki Choshu was putting Osamu Kido in a Sasori-gatame, Maeda delivered a stiff kick to Choshu's face, breaking his orbital bone. The flow of the match was disrupted, as Choshu then tried to attack Maeda, and a finish had to be improvised. The resulting injury would sideline Choshu for well over a month and Maeda was immediately suspended for his actions. The promotion's management offered Maeda to lift the suspension in exchange for going on a training excursion to Mexico to learn lucha libre, but Maeda refused and abandoned New Japan along with his partners in February 1988.

Although the kick is popularly believed to have been a deliberate attack, Maeda has claimed it was actually an accident, with Choshu having supposedly failed at protecting his face at the cue (a tap on his back) before the kick was thrown. Referee Mr. Takahashi, despite disapproving Maeda's stiff style, has agreed it was an accident on a scripted spot, declaring that such miscommunications were not uncommon at the time. Years later, Maeda and Choshu reconciled amicably, to the point where Maeda attended his retirement ceremony.

Newborn UWF (1988–1990)
In 1988, Maeda formed Newborn UWF with Nobuhiko Takada and others, this time as its number one star, using the notoriety he gained in New Japan to draw large crowds. Maeda's UWF became the first promotion to hold a show at the Tokyo Dome, drawing 60,000 to watch Maeda defeat Willy Wilhelm in the main event. In December 1990, Newborn UWF dissolved due to disagreements over the direction of the company.

Mixed martial arts career

Fighting Network RINGS (1991–2002)
Maeda would go on to form Fighting Network RINGS in 1991, while Nobuhiko Takada formed Union of Wrestling Force International with most of the Newborn UWF roster. Fighting Network RINGS would no longer bill itself as wrestling in 1997, after the collapse of UWF International, holding shoot style wrestling matches, legitimate mixed-style fights and later competitive mixed martial arts on the same cards since 1992. In 1999 he retired from active competition after being defeated in a match against three-time Olympic Gold medalist Alexander Karelin, drawing an incredible gate of $2.5 million. The match gained widespread media coverage, including mentions in The New York Times and Sports Illustrated.

Following Maeda's retirement, he switched his promotion's style from shoot style to fully competitive mixed martial arts fighting. The new Rings held two King of Kings tournaments, which introduced such mixed martial artists as Fedor Emelianenko, Dan Henderson, Randy Couture, Jeremy Horn and Antônio Rodrigo Nogueira to the Japanese audience. RINGS folded in 2002, due to the growing popularity of PRIDE.

Revived Rings (2008–present)
When K-1 wanted to start a new MMA brand after their previous attempt with K-1 Romanex, Fighting and Entertainment Group hired Maeda as a consultant for Hero's. However, FEG retired Hero's in February 2008 to team up with former PRIDE staff to create DREAM. Maeda's new project was called The Outsider, an amateur MMA series that uses Hero's rules. RINGS brand was revived for The Outsider series and several events have been held since March 30, 2008.

On January 22, 2012, Maeda decisively resurrected the Fighting Network RINGS brand with Battle Genesis: Vol. 9, the continuation of the Battle Genesis series the last event of which was held on September 20, 2001. The event was sanctioned by ZST.

Mixed martial arts record 
Akira Maeda's Mixed Martial Arts record. The validity of matches is contested.

|-
| Loss
| align=center|7–5
| Alexander Karelin
| Decision (unanimous)
| Rings: Final Capture
| 
| align=center| 3
| align=center| 5:00
| Japan
| 
|-
| Win
| align=center| 7–4
| Magomedkhan Gamzatkhanov
| Submission
| Rings: Battle Dimensions Tournament 1997 Final
| 
| align=center| 1
| align=center| 4:24
| Japan
| 
|-
| Loss
| align=center| 6–4
| Kiyoshi Tamura
| n/a
| Rings: Battle Dimensions Tournament 1997 Final
| 
| align=center| n/a
| align=center| n/a
| Japan
| 
|-
| Win
| align=center| 6–3
| Mitsuya Nagai
| n/a
| Rings: Battle Dimensions Tournament 1997 Final
| 
| align=center| n/a
| align=center| n/a
| Japan
| 
|-
| Win
| align=center| 5–3
| Nikolai Zouev
| Submission (rear-naked choke)
| Rings – Mega Battle Tournament 1997 Semifinal 1
| 
| align=center| 1
| align=center| 5:17
| Japan
| 
|-
| Win
| align=center| 4–3
| Andrei Kopylov
| Submission (rear-naked choke)
| Rings – Extension Fighting 7
| 
| align=center| 1
| align=center| 8:32
| Japan
| 
|-
| Loss
| align=center| 3–3
| Magomedkhan Gamzatkhanov
| Submission (leg lock)
| Rings – Extension Fighting 2
|  
| align=center| 1
| align=center| 8:47
| Japan
| 
|-
| Win
| align=center| 3–2
| Maurice Smith
| n/a
| Rings – Budokan Hall 1997
| 
| align=center| n/a
| align=center| n/a
| Tokyo, Japan
| 
|-
| Win
| align=center| 2–2
| Yoshihisa Yamamoto
| Submission
| Rings – Budokan Hall 1996
| 
| align=center| n/a
| align=center| n/a
| Tokyo, Japan
| 
|-
| Win
| align=center| 1–2
| Dick Vrij
| n/a
| Rings – Battle Dimensions Tournament 1995 Opening Round
| 
| align=center| n/a
| align=center| n/a
| Japan
| 
|-
| Loss
| align=center| 0–2
| Chris Dolman
| Submission (armbar)
| Rings Holland – Free Fight
| 
| align=center| 2
| align=center| 4:07
| Amsterdam, Holland
| 
|-
| Loss
| align=center| 0–1
| Magomedkhan Gamzatkhanov
| Submission
| Rings – Budokan Hall 1995
| 
| align=center| n/a
| align=center| n/a
| Tokyo, Japan
|

Personal life
Maeda's interest in martial arts developed as a schoolboy while watching the Ultraman television series. By the time he was in high school, his only interests were motorcycles and karate. He is friends with Mother series creator Shigesato Itoi.

Maeda was a third-generation Zainichi Korean prior to naturalization.

He is an 8th degree black belt in Kyokushin Budokai.

Works
 (1988)  
 (1988)  
 (1992)  
 (1994)  
 (1994)  
 (1998)  by Toru Sasaki  (Shueisha) ISBN 408780285X
 (1999)   - With Kazuya Fukuda
 (2009)   - With Kotetsu Yamamoto
 (2011)  
 (2017)  
 (2017)  
 (2021)

Championships and accomplishments
Joint Promotions
European Heavyweight Championship (1 time)
Fighting Network RINGS
RINGS Battle Dimensions Tournament (1993–1996)
New Japan Pro-Wrestling
IWGP Tag Team Championship (2 times) – with Osamu Kido (1) and Nobuhiko Takada (1)
Greatest Wrestlers (Class of 2009)
Pro Wrestling Illustrated
PWI ranked him #40 of the 500 best singles wrestlers during the "PWI Years" in 2003
PWI ranked him #13 of the 100 best tag teams during the "PWI Years" with Nobuhiko Takada in 2003
Tokyo Sports
Effort Award (1981)
Match of the Year Award (1986)  vs. Tatsumi Fujinami on June 12
MVP Award (1989)
Special Grand Prize (1988)
Technique Award (1983)
Universal Wrestling Federation
UWF Heavyweight Championship (1 time)
World Wrestling Federation
WWF International Heavyweight Championship (1 time)
Wrestling Observer Newsletter awards
Promoter of the Year (1989)
Wrestler of the Year (1988)
Wrestling Observer Newsletter Hall of Fame (Class of 1996)

Filmography

Notes
1.Per Fighting Network Rings practice of having both worked professional wrestling matches and legitimate Mixed Martial Arts bouts, it is not certain which matches are real or fixed. Matches between 1991-1994 can be verified of being worked, but there is also no certain indication that the matches from 1995 onwards are fully legitimate.

References

External links

1959 births
Living people
Japanese male professional wrestlers
Japanese catch wrestlers
Japanese male mixed martial artists
Japanese male karateka
Mixed martial artists utilizing Kyokushin kaikan
Mixed martial artists utilizing Shorinji Kempo
Mixed martial artists utilizing catch wrestling
Japanese people of Korean descent
Japanese writers
People from Osaka
Professional wrestling trainers
Professional wrestling executives
Naturalized citizens of Japan
Heavyweight mixed martial artists
Mixed martial arts executives
IWGP Heavyweight Tag Team Champions